David A. Matthews was an American soldier who was awarded the Medal of Honor for his actions during the Indian Campaigns. Matthews was born March 7, 1847, in Boston, Massachusetts. He served in the United States Army as a Corporal in Company E of the 8th U.S. Cavalry.
Mathews died in Worcester, Massachusetts, on September 12, 1923.

Medal of Honor Citation
Matthews' Medal of Honor citation reads as follows:
The President of the United States of America, in the name of Congress, takes pleasure in presenting the Medal of Honor to Corporal David A. Matthews, United States Army, for bravery in scouts and actions against Indians during 1868 and 1869, while serving with Company E, 8th U.S. Cavalry, in action at Arizona Territory.

References

People from Boston
United States Army Medal of Honor recipients
People of Massachusetts in the American Civil War
1847 births
1923 deaths
American Civil War recipients of the Medal of Honor